Kali Charan Saraf is a Member of the Legislative Assembly from the Malviya Nagar constituency of the Rajasthan Legislative Assembly in India. He is a leader of Bharatiya Janata Party. He is a former minister in Raje ministry. He studied B Com from Commerce College and law from University Law College of University of Rajasthan. He is the former Medical and Health, Medical and Health Services (ESI), Medical Education, Ayurveda & Indian Medical Methods minister of Rajasthan. He was President of university of Rajasthan.

Background and education 
Kali Charan Saraf was born on 7 August 1951 in Jaipur.

He has degrees of B.com/LLB from Commerce College, Jaipur, affiliated to Rajasthan University, Jaipur.

References

External links

Politicians from Jaipur
Living people
Rajasthan MLAs 2013–2018
1951 births
University of Rajasthan alumni
State cabinet ministers of Rajasthan
Rajasthan MLAs 2008–2013
Bharatiya Janata Party politicians from Rajasthan
Indian politicians convicted of corruption
Rajasthan MLAs 2018–2023